The 2012 Archery World Cup was the 7th edition of the annual international archery circuit, organised by the World Archery Federation. As 2012 was an Olympic year, the World Cup consisted of three, not four legs. The best individual and mixed performers in each discipline over the three legs then joined host representatives in qualifying for the finals.

After failing to be selected for the Korean Olympic team, Kim Woo-jin defeated defending champion Brady Ellison in a one arrow shoot-off to win the men's individual recurve world cup final for the second time, while fellow Korean Ki Bo-bae defeated top seed Deepika Kumari to add her first world cup victory to her Olympic title.

In the compound discipline, Braden Gellenthien and Jamie van Natta produced the second consecutive United States clean sweep, while the United States topped the nations ranking for the third consecutive year.

Competition rules and scoring
The compound legs consisted of a 50m qualification round of 72 arrows, followed by the compound round at 50m on a 6-zone target face, using cumulative scoring for all individual, team and mixed competitions. The top seven individual performers (with no more than two from each country,) plus one host nation representative if not already qualified, proceeded to the finals; the top mixed team performer proceeded to face the host nation at the finals, which were the same competition format as the legs. The team competition was not competed at the finals.

The recurve legs consisted of a FITA qualification round, followed by a 72m Olympic set system. The top seven individual performers (with no more than two from each country), plus one host nation representative if not already qualified, proceeded to the finals; the top mixed team performer proceeded to face the host nation at the finals, which were the same competition format as the legs. The team competition was not competed at the finals.

The scores awarded in the legs were as follows:

Individual scoring

Mixed team scoring

Calendar

Results

Recurve

Men's individual

Women's individual

Men's team

Women's team

Mixed team

Compound

Men's individual

Women's individual

Men's team

Women's team

Mixed team

Medals table

Qualification

Recurve

Men's individual

Women's individual

1. Could not qualify as national quota already reached 
2. Qualified but withdrew

Mixed team

1. Qualified for final as host

Compound

Men's individual

Women's individual

1. Could not qualify as national quota already reached 
2. Qualified but withdrew

Mixed team

Nations ranking

World Cup Final

Recurve

Men's individual

Women's individual

Mixed team

Compound

Men's individual

Women's individual

Mixed team

References

Archery World Cup
World
2012 in Turkish sport
International archery competitions hosted by Turkey
Sports competitions in Antalya
21st century in Antalya
Archery
International archery competitions hosted by China
Sports competitions in Shanghai
2012 in American sports
International archery competitions hosted by the United States
Sports competitions in Utah
Archery World Cup
International archery competitions hosted by Japan
Sports competitions in Tokyo
Archery World Cup